Potsdam Charlottenhof is a railway station in the city of Potsdam, the state capital of Brandenburg, Germany. The ensemble is a protected monument.

References

Railway stations in Brandenburg
Railway stations in Germany opened in 1887
1887 establishments in Prussia
Buildings and structures in Potsdam
Transport in Potsdam